Ak-Dovurak is a town in the Tuva Republic, Russia, located on the Khemchik River (left tributary of the Yenisei),  west of Kyzyl. The population is

History
It was founded in 1964 as a town housing the workers employed in construction of an asbestos plant.

Administrative and municipal status
Within the framework of administrative divisions, it is incorporated as the town under republic jurisdiction (urban okrug) of Ak-Dovurak—an administrative unit with the status equal to that of the districts (kozhuuns). As a municipal division, the town under republic jurisdiction (urban okrug) of Ak-Dovurak is incorporated as Ak-Dovurak Urban Okrug.

References

Notes

Sources

External links
Official website of Ak-Dovurak 
Directory of organizations in Ak-Dovurak 

Cities and towns in Tuva
Cities and towns built in the Soviet Union
Populated places established in 1964
1964 establishments in the Soviet Union